Langstone is a community and village of the city of Newport, Wales. The area is governed by the Newport City Council. The community had a population of 3,279 in 2011.

Location 
Langstone is situated on the eastern edge of the city and is one of Newport's more affluent areas, less than a mile from Junction 24 (Coldra) of the M4 motorway. Some of the ward is hilly and heavily forested, with stunning walks ideal for bird watching, dog walking or just a little stroll. It is bounded to the north and east by the city boundary, to the west by the Caerleon ward with museum's, gallery and Roman secrets galore. To the south west by the Ringland and Llanwern wards. The woods in Ringland are full of native species where ancient and survival craft workshops have been enjoyed by many. Just a short drive east and you can find two stunning castles one in Caldicot, a little further and you have Chepstow Castle and famous racecourse. The wonderful Wentwood forest and tea rooms is just 5 miles from Langstone. The largest ancient woodland in Wales, perfect for foraging, dog walking mountain biking, geocaching and so much more. With a nursery, garden center, cafe, giftshop, garage, greengrocer and thriving village hall, it is truly a little gem. Village life perfectly placed for city living and modern culture or escapism into ancient woods and walks into the past. Perfectly placed to go exploring the stunning Welsh coast and eating fish and chips on the beach in the time it can take to get a takeaway. Ten minutes and you can be at the wonderful Goldcliff Seawall with its ancient secrets captured for all. A mere 20 minutes drive through the rural rolling landscape of the Usk valley and you have the stunning Llandegfedd Lake a hub for health wellbeing and recreation. Great for sailing paddle boarding picnics or fossil hunting.

Development 

The original village was a small linear settlement along the A48 (Chepstow Road) and its offshoot, Tregarn Road. Since the 1990s, many have moved to the area because of its appeal as being rural, but also minutes away from the M4 motorway. This population influx in the '90s resulted in the construction of a large housing development at the bottom of Cat's Ash Road, together with developments of housing estates, big and small, along Tregarn Road and Magor Road.

The community contains the hamlets of Llanbedr, Llandevaud and Llanmartin as well as Langstone itself.

History

The actual village of Langstone (excluding the adjoining villages of Penhow-Parc Seymour, Llanvaches, Llandevaud, Llanbedr and Llanmartin) in 1801 had 126 inhabitants. By 1901 the population had risen to 206. The United Kingdom Census 2001 recorded the population as 3,905 people.

In 1891 Kelly's Directory of Monmouthshire noted that Llanbedr was a hamlet, one and a half miles north-east of the parish, on the road from Newport to Chepstow. There were some remains of a church there, being then used as a barn.

In July 2018, after a long period of warm dry weather, crop marks of a prehistoric or Roman farm near the village were revealed. The site was recorded by the Royal Commission on the Ancient and Historical Monuments of Wales (RCAHMW) before it disappeared again with the next rains.

The parish church has 13th-century origins. In 1622 the nave was extended after the south porch, which is probably 16th-century. The church was restored in 1907 and north and south chapels to the chancel probably date from this time. It is a Grade II listed building. It is part of the Magor Ministry. It  has no known patron saint.

Scheduled Ancient Monuments 

The following Ancient Monuments are in the Langstone community:

 Kemeys Inferior Motte and Bailey castle
 Pen-Toppen-Ash Roman marching camp
 Caer Licyn
 Pencoed Castle
 Langstone Villa moated site
 Langstone Mound and Bailey Castle - discovered in 1964 during construction of the M4 motorway.
 All Saints' Church, Kemeys Inferior
 St Curig's chapel (remains of), Catsash

Both Pencoed Castle and Penhow Castle fall within the boundaries of Langstone. Penhow Castle is privately owned. The area is also home to Penhow Quarry, owned by Hanson plc.

Governance
The Member of Parliament for Newport East, which includes Langstone, is Jessica Morden (Labour) who assumed office in 2005. The Member of the Senedd for Newport East is John Griffiths, who assumed office in 1999.

Since May 2022 Langstone has been part of the 'Bishton and Langstone' electoral ward, which elects two councillors to Newport City Council.

A ward called Langstone existed until 2022, which also covered the communities of Penhow and Llanvaches (ward population 2,770).

Amenities  

Langstone Primary School celebrated its 50th birthday in 2004, and currently has about 300 pupils. Until the 1970s the school intake stretched as far as Nash, Goldcliff, Whitson, Llanwern, Bishton and Llandevaud. The school is now serving simply Langstone and its surrounds.

Pupils receiving a Welsh-medium education have the Welsh-medium  as their local school.

References

External links

Langstone Primary School website
Photos of Langstone and surrounding areas, Geograph 
Ysgol Gymraeg Casnewydd website

Communities in Newport, Wales
Villages in Newport, Wales